Katherine Squire (March 9, 1903 – March 29, 1995) was an American actress who appeared on Broadway and in regional theater, movies and television, from the 1920s through the 1980s.

Early life
Squire was born in Defiance, Ohio. She attended Ohio Wesleyan University and, after graduation, began acting in regional theater at the Cleveland Play House. Squire later studied acting at the American Laboratory Theater.

Career
Squire made her Broadway stage debut in 1927 in Much Ado About Nothing. She later appeared in Broadway productions of Goodbye Again (1932), Hipper's Holiday, Three Men on a Horse (1937), and Lady of Letters (1935), among other plays.

In 1951, Squire made her television debut in an episode of Pulitzer Prize Playhouse. For the remainder of the decade, she appeared in guest roles on Goodyear Playhouse, Robert Montgomery Presents, Westinghouse Studio One, The United States Steel Hour, and Playhouse 90. In 1954, she portrayed Gertrude Harper in the CBS drama Woman with a Past. From 1956 to 1957, Squire had a recurring role in the soap opera Valiant Lady. She made her feature film debut in the 1959 drama The Story on Page One. Squire also continued acting on the stage with roles in The Traveling Lady, Six Characters in Search of an Author, The Sin of Pat Muldoon, and The Shadow of a Gunman.

During the 1960s, Squire continued her career in films, television and stage roles. In 1960, she made two guest appearances on Alfred Hitchcock Presents, and appeared as the mother of Dirk Bogarde's character in Song Without End. Squire returned to the stage the following year in a co-starring role in the New York production of Roots, by Arnold Wesker. On television, she portrayed the title character's mother in Dr. Kildare.  From 1962 to 1963, she guest starred on two episodes of The Twilight Zone: "One More Pallbearer" and "In His Image". She made three guest appearances on Perry Mason: Clara Thorpe in the 1960 episode "The Case of the Credulous Quarry," murderer Vera Hargrave in the 1964 episode "The Case of the Nervous Neighbor," and murderer Esther Norden in the 1965 episode "The Case of the Wrongful Writ." She had additional guest roles on The Road West, Peyton Place, and Adam-12.

In 1971, Squire co-starred in the road film Two-Lane Blacktop. Starting in 1970, she had a recurring role in the long-running soap opera The Doctors. In 1974 and 1975, Squire had her third recurring role on the soap opera Search for Tomorrow. Her last television appearance was in 1975 in the Hallmark Hall of Fame television film Eric, as Mrs. Harris. For the remainder of her career, Squire appeared in roles in regional theater. In 1979, she had a leading role in Hillbilly Women at the Long Wharf Theater in New Haven, Connecticut. In the early 1980s, she acted in Hedda Gabler (starring Susannah York) at the Roundabout Theater, and in Memory of Whiteness at the American Place Theater, both in New York. Squire's final onscreen role was in the romantic comedy film When Harry Met Sally... in 1989.

Personal life
On 19 January 1930, she married actor Byron McGrath, in Cleveland. They subsequently divorced.
In 1940, Squire married actor George Mitchell, with whom she often worked on stage, in film, and on television. They remained married until his death in 1972.

Death
Squire died on March 29, 1995, in Lake Hill, New York, at the age of 92. She was survived by three stepdaughters.

Broadway credits

Filmography

References

External links
 
 
 

1903 births
1995 deaths
20th-century American actresses
Actresses from Ohio
American film actresses
American soap opera actresses
American stage actresses
American television actresses
Ohio Wesleyan University alumni
People from Defiance, Ohio